McGowan v. Maryland, 366 U.S. 420 (1961), was a United States Supreme Court case that upheld Sunday closing laws, in which the court held that laws with religious origins are not unconstitutional if they have a secular purpose.

Background
A large discount store in Anne Arundel County, Maryland was fined for selling goods on a Sunday, in violation of a local blue law.  The Court rejected an establishment clause challenge to laws saying that most large-scale commercial enterprises remain closed on Sundays. The Court's review of the history demonstrated that Sunday closing laws were originally efforts to promote church attendance. "But, despite the strongly religious origin of these laws, non religious arguments for Sunday closing began to be heard more distinctly."

The Court said that the Constitution does not ban federal or state regulation of conduct whose reason or effect merely happens to coincide with the tenets of some or all religions. It concluded that, as currently written and administered, most Sunday closing laws are of a secular rather than religious character. They provide a uniform day of rest for all citizens. To say that the State cannot prescribe Sunday as a day of rest for these purposes solely because centuries ago such laws had their genesis in religion would give a constitutional interpretation of hostility to the public welfare rather than one of mere separation of church and state.

Constitutional text
The relevant clauses of the 1st and 14th Amendments to the United States Constitution:

The 1st Amendment

Congress shall make no law respecting an establishment of religion, or prohibiting the free exercise thereof; or abridging the freedom of speech, or of the press; or the right of the people peaceably to assemble, and to petition the Government for a redress of grievances.

Section 1 of the 14th Amendment

All persons born or naturalized in the United States, and subject to the jurisdiction thereof, are citizens of the United States and of the State wherein they reside. No State shall make or enforce any law which shall abridge the privileges or immunities of citizens of the United States; nor shall any State deprive any person of life, liberty, or property, without due process of law; nor deny to any person within its jurisdiction the equal protection of the laws.

The court's decision
The Court held that Maryland's laws did not violate the First Amendment. The plaintiffs claimed only economic injury, not that they had been prevented from the free exercise of their religion. Writing for the Court, Chief Justice Warren concluded:

[The] appellants allege only economic injury to themselves; they do not allege any infringement of their own religious freedoms due to Sunday closing. In fact, the record is silent as to what appellants' religious beliefs are. Since the general rule is that "a litigant may only assert his own constitutional rights or immunities," (United States v. Raines, 362 U.S. 17, 22) we hold that appellants have no standing to raise this contention.

The Court also held that the law did not violate the Fourteenth Amendment. Chief Justice Warren again:

...the Court has [previously] held that the Fourteenth Amendment permits the States a wide scope of discretion in enacting laws which affect some groups of citizens differently than others. The constitutional safeguard is offended only if the classification rests on grounds wholly irrelevant to the achievement of the State's objective. State legislatures are presumed to have acted within their constitutional power [even when], in practice, their laws result in some inequality.

In reaching their conclusion, the Court also examined the wider question of whether laws proscribing or limiting Sunday trading were constitutional. They held that such laws did not violate the division between church and state, because - no matter the historical roots of such laws - the laws existed as constituted in order to fulfill a secular objective. In other words, even if Sunday trading laws were originally intended to facilitate and encourage church attendance in the colonial United States, the laws as presently constituted were intended to improve the "health, safety, recreation, and general well-being" of citizens. The present purpose of the laws is to provide a uniform day of rest for all; the fact that this day is of particular significance for one or more religions does not bar the State from achieving its secular goals in this manner.

In a dissent, Justice Douglas argued that the Sunday closing laws were an attempt by the Protestant majority to impose its beliefs on the country. He wrote:

The Court picks and chooses language from various decisions to bolster its conclusion that these Sunday laws, in the modern setting, are "civil regulations." No matter how much is written, no matter what is said, the parentage of these laws is the Fourth Commandment, and they serve and satisfy the religious predispositions of our Christian communities. (Also:)  “The First Amendment commands government to have no interest in theology or ritual; it admonishes government to be interested in allowing religious freedom to flourish — whether the result is to produce Catholics, Jews, or Protestants, or to turn the people toward the path of Buddha, or to end in a predominantly Moslem nation, or to produce in the long run atheists or agnostics. On matters of this kind government must be neutral.”

See also 
 Gallagher v. Crown Kosher Super Market of Massachusetts, Inc. (1961): another Sunday shopping court case
 List of United States Supreme Court cases, volume 366

References

See also
List of United States Supreme Court cases, volume 366

External links
 

United States Supreme Court cases
United States Supreme Court cases of the Warren Court
Establishment Clause case law
1961 in United States case law
1961 in religion
Void for vagueness case law
Sunday shopping
Anne Arundel County, Maryland